Vasantrao Deshpande (2 May 1920 – 30 July 1983) was a Hindustani classical vocalist renowned for his contribution to Natya Sangeet (musical dramas).

Early life
Vasantrao Deshpande was born into a Deshastha Brahmin family in Murtizapur, Akola District, in the Vidarbha region of Maharashtra in India. At the age of eight, Vasantrao Deshpande's ability was observed by Bhalji Pendharkar, who cast him in the role of Krishna in the Hindi movie Kaliya Mardan (1935). He obtained his PhD in Music.

Training
Vasantrao Deshpande got trained under several gurus, in various different schools of singing. He began his musical training with Shankarrao Sapre of Gwalior, a disciple of V. D. Paluskar, in Nagpur. After this, he studied under several musicians including Sureshbabu Mane (son of Ustad Abdul Karim Khan) of Kirana gharana, Asad Ali Khan of Patiala gharana, Aman Ali Khan and Anjanibai Malpekar of Bhendibazaar gharana, and Ramkrishnabuwa Vaze (Vazebuwa) of the Gwalior gharana. Dinanath Mangeshkar, a direct disciple of Vazebuwa, had a particularly strong influence over Deshpande, who is regarded as Mangeshkar's musical heir, having adopted his signature mercurial and dramatic style of singing.

Career
Deshpande performed classical and semi-classical music, appearing in movies including Kaliya Mardan, Dudh Bhaat, and Ashtavinayak. He issued several commercial releases under his name, and created raga Raj Kalyan, a variant of Yaman without pancham.

Deshpande's students included Chandrakant Limaye, Vijay Koparkar and Pt Padmakar Kulkarni.

Family
His grandson, Rahul Deshpande, is also a singer, and has also reprised some of his roles on stage and screen, such as Khansaheb in Katyar Kaljat Ghusali. Rahul Deshpande has portrayed Vasantrao in a film entitled Me Vasantrao, that is based on Deshpande's life.

Legacy
A foundation, the Dr. Vasantrao Deshpande Pratishthan, organizes Vasantotsav, an annual music festival at Pune in his memory. The annual festival is held over three days during January. During the festival, two awards, the "Vasantotsav Youth Award" for Promising Artists and the "Vasantotsav Award" for veteran artists, are given out.

In 2011, a three-day music and dance festival in Nagpur was organized by the Indian government's South-Central Zone Cultural Centre (SCZCC) in Deshpande's memory.

A film entitled Me Vasantrao, based on Deshpande's life, was scheduled to be released on 1 May 2020, but was postponed due to the Covid-19 pandemic. Later it was released on 1st April 2022.

Awards
 1982 – Sangeet Natak Akademi Award

Filmography

Film

Theatre

Bibliography

References

Hindustani singers
1920 births
1983 deaths
People from Akola district
Marathi-language singers
Marathi playback singers
20th-century Indian male classical singers
Indian male musical theatre actors
Male actors in Marathi theatre
Recipients of the Sangeet Natak Akademi Award
20th-century Indian male actors
Patiala gharana
Singers from Maharashtra
20th-century Khyal singers